Jason Parham (born 1986) is an American writer and editor. He is senior writer at Wired and the founder and editor-in-chief of the literary magazine Spook. He was previously an editor at Gawker and The Fader, and his work has also appeared in The New York Times Book Review, The Awl, The Atlantic, The Village Voice, and The New York Times Magazine.

Early life
Parham is from Los Angeles, California, growing up in the Ladera Heights area.

Career
Prior to joining Wired magazine, Parham had also been an editor at Gawker, The Fader and Complex, drawing particular notice for commentary on a range of topics, including Outkast, Ferguson, police brutality, and diversity in book publishing, journalism and other media. Wired described Parham's tenure at Gawker as "one of the site’s more visible advocates for inclusion."

Brooklyn Magazine named the "veteran writer and editor" to its 2016 list of "100 Most Influential People in Brooklyn Culture." Honoring Parham on a "32 Under 32" list of "individuals who exhibit the professionalism, hard work, values and talents to lead the reimagining of possibilities for tomorrow’s business culture," Magic Johnson described Parham as a "successful writer" and "cultural connoisseur."

Spook
At the age of 26, Parham founded the literary magazine Spook. He published the first issue in June 2012, and subsequent issues annually.

Naming Spook to its list of "30 Indie Magazines You Need to Know" in 2013, Complex described the journal as a "progressive, independent magazine featuring literary works like poetry and short fiction, as well as covering topics related to art and culture. Only on its second issue, Spook is turning into a highly regarded news source with a global consciousness." Brooklyn Magazine called it a "gorgeous literary magazine" and Salon said Spook "is bringing a more nuanced, careful, thoughtful, complete vision of blackness into publishing...eclectic with beautiful prose, brilliantly cross-secting the diversity of American intellectual life."

References

External links
 Jason Parham
 Spook

1986 births
20th-century African-American people
21st-century African-American writers
21st-century American male writers
African-American writers
American magazine editors
Literary editors
Living people
Wired (magazine) people
Writers from Los Angeles